Jacob Markell (May 8, 1770 – November 26, 1852) was a U.S. Representative from New York, father of Henry Markell.

Born in Schenectady County, New York, Markell attended the common schools.
He moved to Manheim in 1790 and engaged in agricultural pursuits.
He was the Justice of the Peace.
Supervisor of the town of Manheim 1797–1819 and 1824–1829.
He served as judge of the court of common pleas of Montgomery County.

Markell was elected as a Federalist to the Thirteenth Congress (March 4, 1813 – March 3, 1815).
He served as member of the State assembly from Herkimer County in 1820.
He died in Manheim, New York, November 26, 1852.
He was interred in Snells Bush Cemetery, Manheim, New York.

Sources

1770 births
1852 deaths
19th-century American politicians
Members of the New York State Assembly
People from Schenectady County, New York
People from Montgomery County, New York
People from Herkimer County, New York
Federalist Party members of the United States House of Representatives from New York (state)